Iran competed at the 2013 Summer Universiade in Kazan, Russia from 6 to 17 July 2013, with 24 athletes in three sports.

Medals

Medals by sport

Sports

Athletics

Weightlifting

Wrestling

Men's freestyle

Men's Greco-Roman

References

External links
 Iran at Kazan 2013 (World University Games)

Summer U
2013
Nations at the 2013 Summer Universiade